is a Japanese singer and actress.

As a singer, she is best known for the 1994 song "Itoshisa to Setsunasa to Kokoro Zuyosa to" with producer Tetsuya Komuro, which charted at number one and made her the first female artist in Japan to record a double million in CD single sales. It was followed by the number one album Lady Generation: Shukujo no Jidai (1995). Shinohara's musical output saw waning commercial reception in the latter half of the decade, at which she began concentrating on her acting career.

Highlighted by the Japan Times for her "long reign as a TV drama queen", Shinohara's best known acting credits include detective Yukihira Natsumi in the drama series Unfair, which spawned three feature films and several specials; and temp worker Haruko Oomae in Haken no Hinkaku. She has starred in several acclaimed films, winning two Japan Academy Film Prizes for her roles in The House Where the Mermaid Sleeps and Sakura Guardian in the North, both in 2018.

Career
Shinohara appeared in Tetsuya Nakashima's 2004 film Kamikaze Girls.

Filmography

Films
 Shin Funky Monkey Teacher Dotsukaretarunen (1994)
 Funky Monkey Teacher Forever (1995)
 Happy People (1996)
 June Bride (1998)
 Beru Epokku (1998) 
 Go-Con! Japanese Love Culture (2000)
 Red Shadow (2001)
 Calmi Cuori Appassionati (2001) 
 Totunyuuseyo! Asama Sansou Jiken (2002)
 Dawn of a New Day: The Man Behind VHS (2002)
 Kendama (2002)
 Blessing Bell (2003)
 Kamikaze Girls (2004) as Momoko's mom.
 The Uchoten Hotel (2006)
 Unfair (2006) as Natsumi Yukihira

 Hanada Shōnen Shi (2006)
 Unfair: The Movie (2007) as Natsumi Yukihira
 Unfair 2: The Answer (2011) as Natsumi Yukihira
 One Piece Film: Z (2012) as Ain (voice)
 Unfair: The End (2015) as Natsumi Yukihira
 Sakura Guardian in the North  (2018)
 Sunny: Our Hearts Beat Together (2018) as Nami Abe (adult)
 The House Where the Mermaid Sleeps (2018) as Kaoruko Harima
 Bento Harassment (2019) as Kaori Mochimaru
 Wedding High (2022) as Maho Nakagoshi

Television
 Houkago (1992)
 Sugao no Mama de (1992)
 Ninshin Desuyo 2 (1995)
 Kagayaku Toki no Naka de (1995)
 Rennai Zenya: Ichidodake no Koi 2 (1996)
 Pure (1996)
 Naniwa Kinyudo 2 (1996)
 Shinryounaikai Ryouko (1997)
 Gift (1997)
 Bayside Shakedown (1997)
 Ao no Jidai (1998)
 Nanisama (1998)
 Beach Boys Special (1998)
 Kira Kira Hikaru (1998)
 Kiken na Kankei (1999)
 Genroku Ryoran (1999)
 Kabachitare (2000)
 Tokimune Hojo (2000)
 Saotome Typhoon (2001)
 Mukodono! (2001)
 HR (2002)
 Hatsu Taiken (2002)
 Renai Hensachi (2002)
 Boku no Mahou Tsukai (2003)
 Mukodono (2003)
 Mother and Lover (2004)
 Hikari to Tomo ni (2004)
  (2004)
 Yankee Bokou ni Kaeru (2004)
 Naniwa Kinyudo 6 (2005)
 Anego (2005) as Naoko Noda
 Unfair SP (2006) as Natsumi Yukihira
 Message (2006)
 Hanayome wa Yakudoshi (2006)
 Unfair (2006) as Natsumi Yukihira 
 Woman's Island (2006)
 The Pride of the Temp (2007)
 Hataraku Gon! (2009)
 Ogon no Buta (2010)
 Tsuki no Koibito (2010)
 Unfair Double Meaning ~ Yes or No? SP 2 (2013)
 Last Cinderella (2013)
 Lady Girls (2015) as Aki Nakahara
 The Pride of the Temp 2 (2020)
 Ochoyan (2020–21) as Shizu Okada
 Fishbowl Wives (2022)

DubbingWorld War Z, Karin Lane (Mireille Enos)

Discography

Studio albums
 Ryoko from Tokyo Performance Doll (1993) 
 Lady Generation (1995)

Compilation albums
 Sweets: Best of Ryoko Shinohara (1997)

Singles
 "Koi wa Chanson" (1991)
 "Squall" (1992) 
 "Sincerely" (1994)
 "Itoshisa to Setsunasa to Kokoro Zuyosa to" (1994) (Street Fighter II: The Animated Movie'' theme)
 "Motto Motto..." (1995)
 "Lady Generation" (1995)
 "Dame!" (1995)
 "Heibon na Happy ja Monotarinai" (1996)
 "Shiawase wa Soba ni Aru" (1996)
 "Party o Nukedasō!" (1996) 
 "Goodbye Baby" (1997)
 "Blow Up" (1998)
 "A Place in the Sun" (1998)
 "Rhythm to Rule" (2000)
 "Someday Somewhere" (2001)
 "Time of Gold" with Junpei Shiina (2003)

Kōhaku Uta Gassen appearances

Awards

References

External links
 
 
 
 

1973 births
Actors from Gunma Prefecture
People from Kiryū, Gunma
Living people
20th-century Japanese actresses
21st-century Japanese actresses
Japanese idols
Japanese women pop singers
Musicians from Gunma Prefecture
20th-century Japanese women singers
21st-century Japanese women singers